Bhopal is the capital city of the Indian state of Madhya Pradesh and the administrative headquarters of both Bhopal district and Bhopal division. It is known as the City of Lakes due to its various natural and artificial lakes. It is also one of the greenest cities in India. It is the 16th largest city in India and 131st in the world. After the formation of Madhya Pradesh, Bhopal was part of the Sehore district. It was bifurcated in 1972 and a new district, Bhopal, was formed. Flourishing around 1707, the city was the capital of the former Bhopal State, a princely state of the British ruled by the Nawabs of Bhopal. Numerous heritage structures from this period include the Taj-ul-Masajid and Taj Mahal palace. In 1984, the city was struck by the Bhopal disaster, one of the worst industrial disasters in history.

Bhopal has a strong economic base with numerous large and medium industries operating in and around the city. Bhopal is considered as one of the important financial and economic destinations in Madhya Pradesh's two strong wealth pillars, the other being Indore. Bhopal's GDP(nominal) was estimated at INR 44,175 crores (2020–21) by the Directorate of Economics and Statistics, Madhya Pradesh.
A Y-class city, Bhopal houses various educational and research institutions and installations of national importance, including ISRO's Master Control Facility, BHEL and AMPRI. Bhopal is home to a large number of institutes of National Importance in India, namely, IISER, MANIT, SPA, AIIMS, NLIU, IIFM, NIDMP and IIIT (currently functioning from a temporary campus inside MANIT). Bhopal city is also the divisional headquarter of Bhopal division of west central railways (WCR), whose office is located at Habibganj.

Bhopal city also has Regional Science Centre, Bhopal, one of the constituent units of the National Council of Science Museums (NCSM).

The city attracted international attention in December 1984 after the Bhopal disaster, when a Union Carbide pesticide manufacturing plant (now owned by Dow Chemical Company) leaked a mixture of deadly gases composed mainly of methyl isocyanate, leading to one of the worst industrial disasters in the world's history. The Bhopal disaster continues to be a part of the socio-political debate and a logistical challenge for the people of Bhopal.

Bhopal was selected as one of the first twenty Indian cities (the first phase) to be developed as a smart city under PM Narendra Modi's flagship Smart Cities Mission. Bhopal was also rated as the cleanest state capital city in India for three consecutive years, 2017, 2018 and 2019.

History

Early history 

According to folklore, Bhopal was founded in the 11th century by the Paramara king Bhoja, who ruled from his capital at Dhar. This theory states that Bhopal was originally known as Bhojpal after a dam (pal) constructed by the king's minister. An alternative theory says that the city is named after another king called Bhupala (or Bhupal). According to yet another version, Raja Bhoj suffered from leprosy. His physician advised him to build a lake with water from 365 rivers and take daily bath in it. When such a lake was built, it was called Bhoj Tal [or Bhoj's lake]. Gradually people started calling the city Bhojpal, and finally Bhopal.

In the early 17th century, Bhopal was a small village in the Gond kingdom. The modern Bhopal city was established by Dost Mohammad Khan (1660-1726) died at the age of 66, a Pashtun soldier in the Mughal army. After the death of the emperor Aurangzeb, Khan started providing mercenary services to local chieftains in the politically unstable Malwa region. In 1709, he took on the lease of Berasia estate and later annexed several territories in the region to establish the Bhopal State. Khan received the territory of Bhopal from the Gond queen Kamlapati in lieu of payment for mercenary services and usurped her kingdom after her death. In the 1720s, he built the Fatehgarh fort in the village, which developed into the city of Bhopal over the next few decades.

Begum rule 
Bhopal became a princely state after signing a treaty (During the reign of Nazar Mohammed Khan 1816–1819)  with the British East India Company in 1818. Between 1819 and 1926, the state was ruled by four women, Begums – unique in the royalty of those days – under British suzerainty. Qudsia Begum was the first woman ruler (between 1819 and 1837), who was succeeded by her granddaughter, Shah Jehan. Between the years 1844–1860, when Shah Jehan was a child, her mother Sikandar (only daughter of Qudsia) ruled as regent. Curiously during the 1857 revolt, Sikandar supported the British, for which she was rewarded by proclaiming her as king in 1858. To give her further honor, she was given a 19-gun salute and the Grand Cross of the Star of India. The latter made her equivalent to a British person, who had been granted a knighthood. Thus she became, at that time, the only female knight in the entire British Empire besides Queen Victoria. Among the relatively minor rewards, a territory was restored to her, that she had earlier lost to a neighbouring prince.

Sikandar ruled until 1868, when Shah Jehan succeeded her and was Begum until 1901. In 1901, Shah Jehan's daughter Kaikhusrau Jahan became Begum, ruled until 1926, and was the last of the female line of succession. In 1926, she abdicated in favour of her son, Hamidullah Khan, who ruled until 1947, and was the last of the sovereign Nawabs. The rule of Begums gave the city its waterworks, railways, a postal system, and a municipality constituted in 1907.

Post independence 
Bhopal State was the second-largest Muslim-ruled princely state: the first being Hyderabad. After the independence of India in 1947, the last Nawab expressed his wish to retain Bhopal as a separate unit. Agitations against the Nawab broke out in December 1948, leading to the arrest of prominent leaders including Shankar Dayal Sharma. Later, the political detainees were released, and the Nawab signed the agreement for Bhopal's merger with the Union of India on 30 April 1949. The Bhopal state was taken over by the Union Government of India on 1 June 1949.

Bhopal gas tragedy 

In early December 1984, a Union Carbide pesticide plant in Bhopal leaked around 32 tons of toxic gases, including methyl isocyanate (MIC) gas which led to the worst industrial disaster in the world to date.

The official death toll was initially recorded as around 4,000. A Madhya Pradesh government report stated 3,787 deaths, while other estimates state the fatalities were significantly higher (16,000) from the accident and the medical complications caused by the accident in the weeks and years that followed. The higher estimates have been challenged by Union Carbide, however, medical staff in the city were not able to adequately record data due to the massive influx of patients. The impact of the disaster continues to this day in terms of psychological and neurological disabilities, blindness, skin, vision, breathing, and birth disorders.

The soil and ground water near the factory site have been contaminated by the toxic wastes. The Bhopal disaster continues to be the part of the socio-political debate; the clean-up of environmental contamination and rehabilitation of those affected continues to challenge the people of Bhopal.

The centre is seeking a direction to Union Carbide and other firms for  78.44 billion additional amount over and above the earlier settlement amount of US$470 million in 1989 for paying compensation to the gas tragedy victims.

Geography

Bhopal has an average elevation of 500 metres (1401 ft) and is located in the central part of India, just north of the upper limit of the Vindhya mountain ranges. Located on the Malwa plateau, it is higher than the north Indian plains and the land rises towards the Vindhya Range to the south. The city has uneven elevation and has small hills within its boundaries. The prominent hills in Bhopal are the Idgah and Shyamala hills in the northern region, together with the Katara hills in the southern region. There are two lakes namely upper lake and lower lake. The Upper Lake has a surface area of 36 km2 and catchment area of 361 km2 while the Lower Lake has a surface area of 1.29 km2 and catchment area of 9.6 km2. Recently, Bhopal Municipal Corporation came with a resolution to involve local citizens in cleaning, conserving and maintaining the lakes. Bhopal city is divided into two parts where one part which is near the VIP and lake is Old Bhopal (north) and the other, New Bhopal (south), where malls are mainly situated. List of pin codes from Bhopal is 462001 to 462050 which comes under Bhopal postal division (Bhopal Region).

Climate

Bhopal has a humid subtropical climate, with cool, dry winters, a hot summer and a humid monsoon season. Summers start in late March and go on until mid-June, the average temperature being around 30 °C (86 °F), with the peak of summer in May, when the highs regularly exceed 40 °C (104 °F) Extreme high in May was 46.7 °C on 19 May 2016 and in June it was 45.9 °C on 7 June 2019. The monsoon starts in late June and ends in late September. These months see about 40 inches (1020 mm) of precipitation, frequent thunderstorms and flooding. The average temperature is around 25 °C (77 °F) and the humidity is quite high. Temperatures rise again up to early November when winter starts, which lasts up to early March. Winters in Bhopal are cool, and not very much comfortable like summers, with average daily temperatures around 16 °C (61 °F). The winter peaks in January when temperatures may drop close to freezing on some nights. Lowest temperature ever recorded was 0.3 °C. Total annual rainfall is about 1146 mm (46 inches).

Demographics

According to the 2011 census, the population of the Bhopal city (the area under Bhopal Municipal Corporation) is 1,798,218, with 936,168 males and 862,050 females. The population of the Bhopal metropolitan area (the urban agglomeration that extends beyond Bhopal city) was 1,886,100 in 2011. The total effective literacy rate (for population aged 7+ years) was 85.24%, with male and female literacy respectively at 89.2% and 80.1%.

Government and politics
Bhopal is the name of the division, as well as the district and the capital city of the district. The division is headed by the commissioner and additional commissioner for the division. The division has five districts, of which Bhopal is one. Bhopal district administration is headed by the District Magistrate of Bhopal, who is the chief executive officer for the district.

The city is represented in the parliament by Bhopal Lok Sabha constituency, with Pragya Singh Thakur from the BJP elected in 2019. Bhopal also houses the State Legislative Assembly, or the Vidhan Sabha, which seats 230 members of Legislative Assembly. The fourteenth (and current) Vidhan Sabha was elected in December 2018. , the party in the majority in Vidhan Sabha is Bhartiya Janata Party (BJP) with 107 seats which is led by Shivraj Singh Chouhan. Bhopal district elects seven seats to the Assembly, and as per delimitation in 2008, Bhopal city is represented in 6 constituencies:

It is also part of the larger urban agglomeration of Bhopal, with a population of 1,883,381. The first municipal body that governed the municipal population of the city came into being in 1907 in erstwhile Bhopal estate, and was called Majlis-e-intezamia". The first city survey was conducted in 1916 after the enactment of Municipal act. Till 1956, the area under Bhopal Municipal limit was very small, after which surrounding villages were added to it. By 1975, the municipal limit reached 71.23 square km. Bhopal Municipal Council got the status of Municipal Corporation, with total of 56 wards in 1983.

Civic administration

Bhopal Municipal Corporation (BMC) is the urban civic body which oversees the needs of Bhopal city. The municipal corporation follows guidelines under the Madhya Pradesh Municipal Corporation Act, 1956, as well as the Madhya Pradesh Municipalities Act, 1961. In 2015, Kolar Municipal Corporation merged with it, after having been split from it earlier. In 2019, it was announced that the corporation would be split again and a proposal was put forth to the urban administration and housing department, which was criticised by the mayor-in-council. It also proposed for indirect election of the mayor.

The city is divided into 14 zones and 85 wards for the purpose of administration, and each ward is represented by a councillor elected for a term of five years. The winning party elects a council of members, who are responsible for various departments. Ward committees as well as Mohalla committees have been prescribed by the corporation act. In October 2016, the Pioneer reported the meeting of one ward committee in the city. Madhya Pradesh is one of the few states in India, which uses the Mayor-in-Council (MIC) system and hence the elected representatives of the Bhopal Municipal Corporation are also organised as MIC. There are multiple municipal departments in BMC such as Health and Environment; Education, Social JusticeFood and Culture; Planning and Rehabilitation; Public Relations and Library; Fire Brigade and Transport; Power; Engineering; Revenue and Project; Accounting; JnNURM; M.P.U.S.P and General Administration.

Elections held for 85 wards of Bhopal Municipal Corporation on 6 July 2022  As of September 2020, the reservation of wards has been decided. The present mayor of the city is Malti Rai. In 2019, the state government changed the rules that had applied since 1988, allowing the mayor to be indirectly elected, by elected councillors. V.S.Choudhary Kolsani is the municipal commissioner of the city. Additional municipal commissioner is Shashwant Singh Meena.

The municipality receives income from tax collection, assigned revenue, rental income, fees and user charges, revenue grants, income from investment funds. The budget for the year 2020-21 has been approved as Rs 2495 crore.

Civic utilities 
Bhopal Development Authority is the apex body for planning and co-ordination of development activities in the Mandhya Pradesh, which consists of Bhopal and its influence area, and was set up in 1976 under the Bhopal Development Authority Act, 1974.

Electricity in Bhopal is distributed by the Madhya Pradesh Madhya Kshetra Vidyut Vitaran Company Limited, the central discom of the state. It is regulated by the state electricity board, the Madhya Pradesh State Electricity Board (MPSEB), which is located in Bhopal. Fire services are provided by the Bhopal Municipal Corporation.

Bhopal Municipal Corporation is responsible for planning, constructing and maintaining the water supply system within the city. Natural sources of water are surface water (upper lake, kolar reservoir, narmada river), with a significant portion of the population depending on ground water (tubewells, handpumps) as well as privately owned and unaccounted for dugwells and borewells. According to a study done in 2014, piped water supply in the city covers about 6% of the population; however, irregular and bad quality of water supply is a common complaint in the city.

The system of solid waste disposal in urban areas is governed by the municipality under the Municipal Solid Wastes (Management and Handling) Rules 2000. These rules have been framed under the Environment Protection Act, 1986. The city of Bhopal generates 900 tonnes of solid waste. As of 2018, only 1.5% of this waste is segregated. While the municipality website states that door-to-door collection was started by BMC at each zone and ward level from 15 August 2013, Free Press Journal has reported in 2020 that the civic body has failed in the same. Bhopal has 8 transfer stations, where the garbage collected zone wise is dumped, and without any segregation, the waste is transferred to the Adampur Chhawni landfill site. In 2018, after the National Green Tribunal (NGT) directed the BMC to clean dump at Bhanpur, which activists claim is 80 feet high and has polluted ground water up to 500 metres below, the trenching ground was shifted to Adampur. In 2019, it was announced that India's first e-waste clinic was being set up in Bhopal. BMC along with Central Pollution Control Board came together to establish this clinic which will enable segregation, processing and disposal of waste, both residential and commercial. In January 2020, the clinic was inaugurated for operations. It started initially as a three-month pilot and if the pilot is successful, the clinics will be opened in other places as well.

As of 2017, the city of Bhopal produces 310 MLD of sewage per day, of which only 50 MLD is treated in the 7 Sewage treatment plants that have a capacity of 80 MLD. Most of the sewage reaches water bodies, the Upper and Lower Lake, Motia Lake, Siddique Hasan Lake, Munshi Hussain Khan Lake. There are about 800 large drains in Bhopal. About 80% sewerage water mixes with storm water drains main drains include Patra, Mandi and Hataikheda, Jatkhedi.

After a gap of 25 years, the state capital's masterplan 2031 was finally released in March 2020 by the Directorate of Town and Country Planning, Madhya Pradesh. The previous masterplan of 1995 was valid until 2005; and Bhopal had no masterplan between 2005 and 2020. Bhopal Municipal Corporation was ranked 3rd out of 21 Cities for best governance and administrative practices in India in 2014. It scored 3.7 on 10 compared to the national average of 3.3.

Culture 

Diwali and Eid are major festivals in Bhopal. Gifts and sweets are exchanged and donation are made to the poor. Diwali is celebrated by worshiping the wealth goddess Lakshmi. Eid is special to the city as all the Hindus take time out to visit their Muslim friends and greet them and get treated with delicacies, the speciality of the day being sweet sewaiya. Bhopali culture is such that both Hindus and Muslims visit each other on their respective festivals to greet and exchange sweets. During Ganesh puja and Durga Puja (Navratras), idols of Ganesh and Durga are established in jhankis throughout the city. People throng to offer prayers to their deities. At the end of Navratras, on the day of Vijayadashami (or Dussehra), huge effigies of Ravan are burnt in different parts of the city. Apart from jhankis, several Bengali associations like TT Nagar Bengali association, BHEL Kalibari, Arera Colony Bangiya parishad, Sundervan Bairagarh, Purbachal club, Habibganj Kalibari, Kolar Kalibari celebrates the annual Durga puja in a huge way where large idols of mother goddess and pandals are installed and bhog is served. TT nagar Bengali association had its 65th year Durgotsav in the year 2021. Also, these associations conduct several cultural programmes and other pujas like Kalipuja, Saraswati puja etc. One of the famous kali puja in new bhopal region is Trilanga Kali puja committee which conducts kalipuja from the last 25 years. 
Other places of worship and cultural activities for the Bengali Speaking Hindu diaspora includes Ramakrishna Mission Ashrama and Bharat Sevashram Sangha. Bhopal Ijtema is an annual Muslim world preachers congregation, is held at EIntkhedi 11 km from Bhopal. The annual congregation near Bhopal attracts between 500,000 and 1,000,000 Muslims globally.

Architecture
The Nawabs of Bhopal built several structures including the Taj-ul-Masajid and Taj Mahal palace in Indo-Islamic and European styles.

Bharat Bhavan is the main cultural centre of the city, and hosts many theatre and film festivals every year. It has an art gallery, an open-air amphitheatre facing the Upper Lake, two other theatres and a tribal museum. The Bharat Bhavan as well as the MP Legislative Assembly were designed by Charles Correa.

Economy

The economy of Bhopal is heavily industrial based with pharmaceutical, automobile, textile, and production of electrical goods mostly being prevalent. Nominal GDP of Bhopal District was Rs. 44,175 crores for the year 2020–21 with a per-capita GDP of INR 1,40,729 as per the Directorate of Economics and Statistics (Madhya Pradesh). The major industries in the old city are electrical goods, medicinal, cotton, chemicals and jewellery. Other industries include cotton and flour milling, cloth weaving and painting, as well as making matches, sealing wax, and sporting equipment. The residents of Bhopal also engage in large retail businesses. Handicrafts, like zardozi and batua (a small string purse, usually used with Indian traditional dresses) are some of the products of the Old City.

Bhopal is also home to the DB Corp, informally called the Bhaskar Group (named after its major publication Dainik Bhaskar), a ₹17 billion business conglomerate with a strong presence in media. Its head office is located in Maharana Pratap Nagar. While an IT Park, near Bhopal Airport, houses various software development companies and the city is expected to further enlarge its IT presence in near future with giants like WIPRO intending to establish software development centre in the city. Other Software and IT companies established in the city include Sutherland Global Services, ISoft InfoTech, Soluzione IT Services, Netlink Software Pvt Ltd., Caresoft Inc India, Osmo IT Solution Pvt Ltd., and many more.

Manjul Publishing House, located in the old city, is a major publishing house made famous by the translation of the Harry Potter series of novels into Hindi.

Industries
Bharat Heavy Electricals Limited, the largest engineering and manufacturing enterprise in India, has a unit in Bhopal. It occupies a large area in the Eastern Part of the city and maintains a suburb named after it. A majority of the residents of the BHEL Suburb are employed by the unit. Govindpura Industrial Area is a huge industrial zone situated in northern limits of the city. 
Mandideep is an industrial suburb of Bhopal. It is located to the south of the city on the NH 12. Manufacturing units in Mandideep include HEG Limited, Procter & Gamble, Lupin Limited, Eicher Tractors, Insulators and Electricals Limited, Tafe Motors And Tractors Limited, B. S. Engineering Works, etc.
Rapidly transforming industrial zones near Bhopal also include Bagroda AKVN, Tamot Plastic Park and Acharpura Industrial Area. With the state government providing conducive environment for setting up of manufacturing units, the industrial zones have seen exponential demand from the investors to purchase the land which are provided at heavily subsidized prices.
Bhopal also has in its vicinity Badiyakhedi Industrial Area (Sehore), Pilukhedi Industrial Area (Rajgarh), Budhni Industrial Area (Sehore), Jamuniya Khejda (Raisen) and Mohasa Babai Industrial Area (Narmadapuram). The industrial areas have attracted huge investments with companies like Welspun Corp. Ltd, Vardhaman Industries, Trident Group, Lapp India, and Inox Air Products Pvt. Ltd. already operating manufacturing plants in various industrial belts.

Upcoming Projects
Bhopal also has many other mega projects lined up in its vicinity. In March 2022, Madhya Pradesh government announced the development of Bagroda Industrial Area Phase-2 after observing the immense interest of investors to set up manufacturing units near Bhopal. The government has also decided to develop Berasia Industrial Area in Bhopal district, a site close to Jaipur-Bhopal Highway and Delhi-Gwalior-Bhopal Highway.
In the sphere of IT development, a mega skill park with a total investment of more than INR 1,500 crores is being built in the eastern portion of the city. The Global Skills Park, Bhopal is a highly touted project of the Central and the state government which is being funded by the Asian Development Bank (ADB). The Park is expected to be fully commissioned at the end of 2023. While the IT Park near Bhopal Airport is eying investments of software companies including TCS and Wipro. IT startups of the city are already functioning in this area.
Bhopal is set to be a crucial intermediate city under the recently announced Delhi-Nagpur industrial corridor. While a multi-modal logistics park has been proposed to take shape near Mandideep. NHAI has already prepared DPR for the upcoming ring road project between Obaidullaganj and Sehore with a cost of around Rs. 720 crores.

Transport

By air

The Raja Bhoj International Airport is located near the suburb of Sant Hirdaram Nagar (formerly known as Bairagarh) and is the primary airport serving the state of Madhya Pradesh, India.

There are three routes or ways to reach the airport: (1) Via Bairagad, (2) Via Panchvati, (3) Via Gandhi Nagar road (N.H 12). From within the city, VIP Road, a four lane road takes one to the airport, which lies 15 km to the north of the city. International flights began operations in 2010.
Domestic direct flight services are operated by Air India, Spice Jet and Indigo. As of January 2020, Bhopal has non-stop flights to New Delhi, Mumbai, Jaipur, Ahmedabad, Udaipur, Bangalore, Hyderabad, Pune and Raipur.
There are no international flight from Bhopal.

Rail

Bhopal lies in the West Central Railway Zone. Considering both north–south and east–west train routes, it is one of the most rail connected cities in India which halts more than 200 daily trains, with a total of more than 380 trains within a week. The main stations of Bhopal are the Bhopal Junction station and Rani Kamlapati Railway station  along with Sant Hirdaram Nagar railway station. The main stations are equipped with WiFi, have enough: waiting halls, refreshment centers, passenger ticket counters and ticket vending machines, vehicle parking, communication facilities, sanitary facilities and dedicated government railway police force to ensure security. Altogether the city has six railway stations within its city limits.

The Divisional Railway Manager's (DRM) office of Bhopal Division is situated close to the Railway station, at Habibganj, the southern location in Bhopal City. The division falls under West Central railways.

Roads

National Highway 46 forms a ring-road around Bhopal which connects it to Jabalpur in the East (via NH 45) and Jaipur to the North west. NH 146, a branch of NH 46, connects the city to Kanpur in the North . State Highway 18 connects the city with Indore (with Sehore and Dewas on the way). State Highway 23 connects the city to Guna and Berasia in the north.

An interstate bus terminus inaugurated in 2011, the Kushabhau Thakre Inter State Bus Terminal is located near the Rani Kamlapati  railway station,

Urban transport

Bhopal BRTS 
The Bus Rapid Transit System, which opened in 2013, is run by Bhopal City Link Limited (BCLL). The company has identified 4 trunk and 8 standard routes in the city on which 225 buses would be operated daily (365 a day in a year), from 5 a.m. to 11 p.m. 82 bus stops are built along the 24 km long corridor.

Metro Rail 
The Bhoj Metro project is under construction for the city.

Education

Basic education 

Bhopal has more than 550 state-sponsored schools, most of which are affiliated to the Madhya Pradesh Board of Secondary Education (MPBSE). In addition, there are three Kendriya Vidyalayas in the city. The city is also served by numerous other private schools affiliated to either CBSE, ICSE, MPBSE, NIOS and CIE (Cambridge).

Schools include Delhi Public School, Bhopal (CBSE), The Sanskaar Valley School (ICSE & Cambridge International Examinations), Campion School (CBSE), Shree Bhavan's Bharti Public School (CBSE) and St. Joseph's Convent (CBSE).

Higher education

The institutes and universities headquartered in the city include:

Research Institutes

Bhopal offer a number of Research institutes. Some are under central and some under state government, including CSIR AMPRI and IISER.

Sports

Teams 
Bhopal Badshahs is a hockey team based in Bhopal that plays in World Series Hockey. The team is captained by Indian hockey player Sameer Dad and coached by Vasudevan Bhaskaran who was the captain of India's Olympic victory in 1980 Summer Olympics in Moscow. Badshahs defeated Chandigarh Comets in the inaugural match of 2012 World Series Hockey 4–3. Aishbagh Stadium in Bhopal is the home ground of Bhopal Badshahs.

Stadiums 
 Aishbagh Stadium is a field hockey stadium in Bhopal.
 TT Nagar Stadium is a multi-purpose stadium is Bhopal.

Places of interest

Nature 

Bhimbetka Caves are about 35 kilometres from Bhopal city. They have evidence of dwellings of pre-historic man during the Paleolithic era. Rock paintings in the caves are specimens of pre-historic settlements in India. There are about 600 caves, but only 12 are open for visitors. The caves are located in the midst of sal and teak forests and includes a short trail around the caves. They were discovered by Wakankar in 1957. UNESCO declared Bhimbetka Caves as a World Heritage Site in 2003.

Van Vihar National Park is a national park in central India. It is located in Bhopal, the capital city of Madhya Pradesh. Declared a national park in 1979, it covers an area of about 4.45 km2. Although it has the status of a national park, Van Vihar is developed and managed as a modern zoological park, following the guidelines of the Central Zoo Authority. The animals are kept in their near natural habitat. Most of the animals are either orphaned brought from various parts of the state or those, which are exchanged from other zoos. No animal is deliberately captured from the forest.[1] Van Vihar is unique because it allows easy access to the visitors through a road passing through the park, security of animals assured from poachers by building trenches and walls, chain-link fence and by providing natural habitat to the animals.

Apart from Lakes, Bhopal also has many water reservoirs(Dams) in and around the city. The Dams are Bhadbhada Dam, Kerwa Dam, Kaliyasot Dam, Halali Dam and Kolar Dam. People of Bhopal mostly visit these places during weekends. The weather is pleasant during and post monsoon. These places are surrounded by greenery throughout the year.

Activity centres 
The Museum of Man in Bhopal exhibits tribal and folk houses from all corners of India.

Shopping
The New Market is a commercial area in Bhopal. It is characterised by offices, new businesses and trade establishments. Notable malls include DB City Mall in MP Nagar, and Aashima Anupama Mall. Apart from New Market, people can go for shopping at Chowk Bazar and Sarafa in Old City Area of Bhopal.

Tourist attractions
This is a list of tourist attractions in or near Bhopal:
Upper Lake (Bhopal) 
Van Vihar National Park 
Bhimbetka rock shelters 
Raisen 
Sanchi
Shaurya Smarak 
Taj-ul-Masjid 
Bhojeshwar Temple 
Lower Lake (Bhopal) 
Taj Mahal (palace) 
Bharat Bhavan 
Regional Museum of Natural History, Bhopal 
Indira Gandhi Rashtriya Manav Sangrahalaya 
Kamlapati Palace

Notable people

Politics, civil service, science 

Anees Ahmed – Lawyer in United Nations Peacekeeping Operations and United Nations International Criminal Tribunals
Mohamed Barakatullah Bhopali – Revolutionary
Balthazar Napoleon IV de Bourbon – Head of the House of Bourbon-Bhopal
Munshi Hakimuddin - Chief Secretary at Bhopal state, known for Sadr Diwani Adalat
Najma Heptulla – Former Union Minister
Kailash Chandra Joshi – Former Chief Minister of Madhya Pradesh
Abdul Qadeer Khan – Pakistani nuclear physicist
Raghuram Rajan – 23rd Governor of RBI
Shankar Dayal Sharma – 9th President of India
Paul Shrivastava – Professor of Management & Chief Sustainability Officer, The Pennsylvania State University
Amit Sood –  American physician, professor and author

Literature 

Manzoor Ahtesham – writer
Javed Akhtar – poet, screenwriter and lyricist
Bashir Badr – poet
Asad Bhopali – poet and lyricist
Kaif Bhopali – poet and lyricist
Manzar Bhopali – poet
Mohsin Bhopali – poet and travel writer
Geet Chaturvedi – poet, novelist and lyricist

Sports 

 Fatima Bano - female wrestling coach
 Sameer Dad – National hockey player
 Bhawna Dehariya – First female of Madhya Pradesh summit Mount Everest
 Aslam Sher Khan – National hockey player and Member of Parliament
 Shahryar Khan – Chairman of Pakistan Cricket Board
 Mansoor Ali Khan Pataudi – Former Captain of the India national cricket team
 Jalaluddin Rizvi – National hockey player and Arjuna Award winner

Film, television and art 

Shawar Ali – Actor
Jaya Bachchan – Actress
Stebin Ben – Singer
Shakeela Bano Bhopali – film actress and the first women Qawwal of India
Shoaib Ibrahim – TV actor
Annu Kapoor – Actor, TV presenter and National Film Award winner
Arshi Khan – Actress, model
Sara Khan – Actress
Sunil Lahri – Actor
Munnawar Masoom – Qawwali singer
Vipul Roy – Actor
Eisha Singh – Actress
Saumya Tandon – Television actress
Divyanka Tripathi – Actress
Rajeev Verma – Actor

See also 
Bhopal (Lok Sabha constituency)
Regional Museum of Natural History, Bhopal
Bhabha Engineering Research Institute
Sagar Institute of Science and Technology

References

Further reading

External links

 
Metropolitan cities in India
Cities and towns in Bhopal district

Indian capital cities
Populated places established in the 1720s
1720s establishments in India
Former capital cities in India
Cities in Madhya Pradesh
 
B
B